Ashraf is a speech variety of uncertain classification within the East Omo-Tana sub-branch found in the Marka district of the Lower Shebelle region and Banaadir region of southern Somalia.

Classification 
According to Blench (2006) there are two sub-dialects: Shingani and Lower Shebelle. As noted in recent work on the speech variety, Green & Jones (2016):"What we hope to have illustrated in this talk is that while Marka (Af Ashraaf) may be similar in certain ways to both Northern Somali and Maay, it nonetheless boasts a number of unique properties, particularly in its morphology, that we believe merit its treatment not as a Somali or Maay dialect, but as a language variety of its own"A similar level of skepticism towards the labelling of other Omo-Tana languages in Somalia (such as Maay, Dabarre, Jiddu, so forth) is expressed in Tosco (2012):"It is well-known that the term 'dialects' may refer to different 'things'. Within Somalia, it is safe to say that all the Somali dialects are 'dialects' from a sociolinguistic point of view, that is, in terms of their social role, their general absence in written media, and the speakers' acceptance of Northern-Central Somali as a common medium. From a strictly linguistic point of view, however, mutual comprehension should be assessed and dialects labelled accordingly (as mutually understandable varieties of a language). No classification so far does that."

Phonology 
The phonological inventory of Ashraaf is as follows:

See also
Northern Somali
Benadiri Somali

References

Further reading 

 Christopher R. Green & Evan Jones. 2019. Notes on the morphology of Marka (AfAshraaf). In Emily Clem, Peter Jenks & Hannah Sande (eds.), Theory and description in African Linguistics: Selected papers from the 47th Annual Conference on African Linguistics, 119–133. Berlin: Language Science Press. 
 Ajello, Roberto. 1984. Il focus nell'idioma degli Ashraaf di Shingaani. In Puglielli, Annarita (ed.), Aspetti morfologici, lessicali e della focalizzazione, 133-146. Roma: Dipartimento per la Cooperazione allo Sviluppo, Ministero degli Affari Esteri (Italia).

Omo–Tana languages